John Aristotle Phillips (born August 23, 1955) is a U.S. entrepreneur specializing in political campaigns, who became famous for attempting to design a nuclear weapon while a student.

"A-Bomb Kid"
Phillips was born in August 1955 to Greek immigrant parents and raised in North Haven, Connecticut. In 1976, while attending Princeton University as a junior undergraduate, he designed a nuclear weapon using publicly available books and papers. In February 1977, several months after the story first went public, Phillips was contacted by a Pakistani official trying to purchase his bomb design, an incident addressed on the Senate floor by William Proxmire and Charles Percy. Phillips was a celebrity by this time, dubbed The A-Bomb Kid by the media, and making a series of television appearances including a featured spot on the game show To Tell the Truth.

Phillips was an underachieving student who played the tiger mascot at Princeton games. Hoping to stay at the school, he proposed a term paper for a seminar on nuclear proliferation outlining the design for an atomic bomb similar to the Nagasaki weapon. Whether the weapon as designed would have actually exploded was questioned. Dr. Frank Chilton, a California nuclear scientist who at that time specialized in nuclear explosion engineering, said Phillips’s design was "pretty much guaranteed to work.". The Federal Bureau of Investigation confiscated Phillips's term paper and a mockup he had constructed in his dormitory room. In 1979, Phillips published his story together with a co-author, David Michaelis], as Mushroom: The True Story of the A-Bomb Kid ( / ).

Political activity
Phillips parlayed his celebrity status into a brief career as an anti-nuclear activist. In 1980 and 1982 he ran for the United States House of Representatives as a Democratic Party candidate in Connecticut's 4th congressional district, losing both times to Republican Stewart McKinney.

Aristotle, Inc.
The experience he had gained during his campaigns obtaining the voter list from the state and using it for campaign purposes led him and his brother Dean (who had written a program to handle the list on an Apple II) to found Aristotle, Inc. in 1983, a non-partisan technology consulting firm for political campaigns which John Philips has since led as the CEO. It specializes in combining voter lists with personal data from other sources (such as income, gun ownership or church attendance) and data-mining, to assist with micro-targeting of specific voter groups; as of 2007, its database contained detailed information about ca. 175 million U.S. voters and it had about 100 employees.
Aristotle has served every occupant of the White House since Ronald Reagan, and consults for several top political action committees.

In 1998 he spoke of the critical importance to a political campaign of targeting its advertising, including on the World Wide Web.  In 2009 he observed that 8.9% of registered voters in the United States are ineligible to vote because they have moved away or died.

As of 2007, Phillips lived in San Francisco with his wife, Patricia and daughter, Katherine Grace.

See also
Born secret
United States v. The Progressive, et al.
Nth Country Experiment
The Manhattan Project (film)

References

Further reading
 John Aristotle Phillips and David Michaelis (1978), Mushroom: The Story of the A-Bomb Kid, New York:  Morrow,  .

External links
 John Aristotle Phillips Bio on Aristotle, Inc's home page

American anti–nuclear weapons activists
Nuclear secrecy
American political consultants
Living people
1955 births
People from North Haven, Connecticut
Princeton University alumni
American people of Greek descent